On 4 January 1989, two Grumman F-14 Tomcats of the United States Navy shot down two Libyan-operated Mikoyan-Gurevich MiG-23 Floggers which the American aircrews believed were attempting to engage and attack them, as had happened eight years prior during the 1981 Gulf of Sidra incident.

Background
In 1973, Libya claimed much of the Gulf of Sidra (south of Latitude 31° 30′) as its territorial waters and subsequently declared a "line of death", the crossing of which would invite a military response. The United States did not recognize Libya's territorial claims and continued to challenge the line, leading to military hostilities in August 1981 and March 1986. A terrorist attack in Germany which killed two American soldiers and one Turkish civilian on 5 April 1986 was linked to Libya and prompted the U.S. to carry out retaliatory air strikes against targets in Libya ten days later.

Attempts by Libya to obtain weapons of mass destruction were of great concern to U.S. President Ronald Reagan's administration since it viewed Libya as a state sponsor of terrorism. Tensions between Libya and the U.S. were running high after the latter accused Libya of building a chemical weapons plant near Rabta in the fall of 1988. During a December 1988 press interview, Reagan indicated the potential for military action to destroy the plant. The possibility of a U.S. attack caused Libya to increase its air defenses around Rabta and its state of military readiness throughout the country.

Engagement

On the morning of 4 January 1989, the aircraft carrier  was sailing toward the eastern Mediterranean Sea for a scheduled port visit to Haifa, Israel. Aircraft operating from the Kennedy included several flights of A-6 Intruders on exercises south of Crete, two pairs of F-14 Tomcats from VF-14 and VF-32 conducting combat air patrols, and an E-2 Hawkeye from VAW-126 providing airborne early warning and control. 

The easternmost combat air patrol station was provided by the two F-14s from VF-32 with aircraft call signs Gypsy 207 (crewed by Commander Joseph Bernard Connelly and Commander Leo F. Enwright in Bureau Number 159610) and Gypsy 202 (crewed by Lieutenant Herman C. Cook III and Lieutenant Commander Steven Patrick Collins in Bureau Number 159437). He gave the American air crews a special briefing emphasizing their rules of engagement.

At 11:55 local time, the airborne E-2 detected two Libyan MiG-23 Floggers taking off from Bomba (Al Bumbah) airfield near Tobruk, and observed them heading north toward the battle group. The two F-14s from VF-32 were directed to intercept the MiG-23s, while the F-14s from VF-14 covered the A-6s as they departed to the north. Unlike some previous aerial encounters in which Libyan pilots were instructed to turn back after detecting an F-14's radar signal sweep their aircraft, the MiG-23s continued to close on the American fighters with a head-on approach.

As both pairs of aircraft converged, the E-2 and other U.S. eavesdropping assets in the area monitored radio communications between the Libyan aircraft and their ground controllers. The Americans listened to the MiG-23s receiving guidance to intercept the F-14s from ground controllers at a radar station in Bomba. This radar station was one of several activated along the Libyan coast to support the MiG-23s.

At 11:58, the F-14s made a left turn, away from the MiG-23s, to initiate a standard intercept. Seven seconds later, the MiG-23s turned back into the American fighters for another head-on approach and were descending in altitude. At this point, the F-14 aircrews began employing tactics to reduce the effectiveness of the MiG-23s' radars and the 12-mile-range AA-7 Apex missiles they were potentially carrying. The drop in altitude was meant to prevent the MiG-23s from detecting the F-14s by using ocean clutter to confuse their onboard radars. The American pilots executed another left turn away from the Libyan aircraft during the descent.

The air warfare commander on the Kennedy gave the American aircrews the authority to fire if they believed the MiG-23s were hostile. The F-14s turned away from the approaching MiG-23s two more times, and each time, the American aircrews saw the Libyan aircraft turn back toward them for a head-on approach. At 12:00:53, the Radar Intercept Officer (RIO) in the lead F-14, Commander Leo Enwright in Gypsy 207, ordered the arming of the AIM-7 Sparrow and AIM-9 Sidewinder missiles on the American fighters, after what he determined was the fifth time the Libyan aircraft turned back toward them.

There was no response to his call. The missile failed to track toward its target.

The F-14s executed a defensive split, where both aircraft made turns in opposite directions. Both Libyan fighters turned left to pursue the second F-14, Gypsy 202. Connelly prepared Gypsy 207 for a right turn to get behind the MiG-23s as they went after the other American fighter.

After executing a sharp right turn, Gypsy 207 gained a position in the rear quadrant of the remaining MiG-23. The second MiG-23 was hit by the AIM-9 at 12:02:36. The F-14s descended to an altitude of several hundred feet and returned at high speed to the carrier group. The Libyan pilots were both seen to successfully eject and parachute into the sea, but it is not known whether the Libyan Air Force was able to successfully recover them.

Aftermath

The following day, Libya accused the U.S. of attacking two unarmed reconnaissance planes which were on a routine mission over international waters. Libyan leader Muammar Gaddafi called for a United Nations emergency session to take up the incident. The U.S. claimed the American aircrews acted in self-defense due to demonstrations of hostile intent by the Libyan aircraft. 

Two days after the engagement, the Pentagon released photographs taken from the videotapes on the F-14s which, according to U.S. naval intelligence analysts, showed the lead MiG-23 armed with two AA-7 Apex missiles and two AA-8 Aphid missiles. The AA-7 can be either a semi-active radar-homing missile or an infrared-homing (heat-seeking) missile, and it can be fired at another aircraft from head-on. The imagery was used to prove the Libyan fighters were armed and helped support the U.S. position that the MiG-23s were hostile.

The intent for the Libyan aircraft on 4 January is not known for certain. Gaddafi could have believed the U.S. was preparing an attack on the chemical facility in Rabta and ordered his military to see if the aircraft offshore were bombers bound for targets in Libya. The possible reasons for the MiG-23s' flight profile range from a deliberate attack against the battle group to a radio breakdown with ground controllers leading to the Libyan fighters merging with the F-14s.

Details released three months after the incident revealed that the MiG-23s never turned on their fire control radars, needed to guide their AA-7 missiles at maximum range. The turns by the Libyan pilots prior to the first missile launch by the F-14s were considered too slight to be hostile, according to U.S. House Armed Services Committee chairman Les Aspin. Despite these findings, Aspin said the self-defense claim by the U.S. was still justified due to the continued acceleration of the MiG-23s as they closed the distance with the F-14s and Libya's history of firing first.

Legacy

F-14 Tomcat Bureau Numbers 159437, 159610
At the request of the National Air and Space Museum, the U.S. Navy provided Bureau Number (BuNo) 159610 to its Udvar-Hazy location near Dulles International Airport. Although Tomcat BuNo 159610 downed the Libyan MiG-23 as a VF-32 F-14A model Tomcat, it returned from that deployment and was entered into the F-14D re-manufacture program, later serving in a precision strike role as a VF-31 F-14D(R).

, BuNo 159437 was still stored at the Aircraft Maintenance and Restoration Group (AMARG) facility at Davis-Monthan AFB. One of eight F-14s remaining in the AMARG complex, it has not been scrapped due to impending museum placement.

In popular culture

Parts of the audio of the engagement were used in the 1992 movie Under Siege and the soundtrack to MicroProse's 1998 video game, Falcon 4.0.

See also

 Hainan Island incident – an incident involving aircraft between the U.S. and China
 Operation Odyssey Dawn
 Pan Am Flight 103
 Ouadi Doum air raid

References

Citations

Bibliography

 Gillcrest, Paul T. Tomcat!: The Grumman F-14 Story. Atglen, Pennsylvania: Schiffer Publishing, Ltd. 1994. 
 Stanik, Joseph T. El Dorado Canyon: Reagan’s Undeclared War with Qaddafi. Annapolis, Maryland: Naval Institute Press, 2003.

External links
Brief description of the incident
January 16, 1989 Time Europe story, with details of the radio broadcasts and times.
Air aces record
VF-32 photo gallery
Audio recording of the engagement
Libyan Wars, 1980–89, Part 6 – Chemical Reaction, Tom Cooper.
video footage of the incident

Conflicts in 1989
Gulf of Sidra
Cold War military history of the United States
1989 in the United States
1989 in Libya
Air-to-air combat operations and battles
20th-century aircraft shootdown incidents
Military history of Libya
Libya–United States military relations
Aviation accidents and incidents in 1989
Aviation accidents and incidents in the Mediterranean Sea
January 1989 events in Africa